The Coupe de l'Espérance was a rugby union competition that was played in France to replace the national championship during World War I, as many players were sent to the front. The teams used mostly young boys who had not been drafted yet. The cup was awarded only four times (1916-1919) and does not count as a full championship title among club honours.

Finals (by year)

See also 
Ligue Nationale de Rugby
Top 14

Rugby union competitions in France